Bradda Head is a rugged headland in the south-west of the Isle of Man, in the British Isles, rising to a height of . It shelters Port Erin Bay from the north.

There is a clifftop walk, the Coronation Footpath, up to the head and around the head via Milner's Tower. This was built in 1871 as a view tower in memory of William Milner of the then-famous Milner's Safe Co. Ltd., maker of fire-resistant safes and a local philanthropist. His tower is built in the shape of a key and lock. The Mourne Mountains of Northern Ireland can sometimes be seen from the summit.

History
Copper was quarried here in the Bronze Age.  There is an ancient cairn on nearby Bradda Hill.  An ancient coin hoard was found at Bradda Head in 1848. Prior to the Second World War, there was a thriving fishing trade in scallops taken off Bradda Head.  There are disused mine workings on the headland, local documents show that mining took place from at least the 1650s until closure in 1874, by which time the shafts had been sunk far below sea-level.

Contemporary uses
The site is popular with walkers, photographers and artists, and the 1931 "Kodak World's Best Photograph" was made here. C.W. Powell won £4,000 for the picture.  The clear waters of the headland are also popular with scuba divers.

References

External links
Photochrome colour photograph of the head, made between 1890 and 1900
Milner's Tower

Headlands of the Isle of Man